Simoniz USA, Inc. (Pronounced "Simon eyes") is an American manufacturer of automobile and janitorial cleaning products. The original Simoniz Company was founded in 1910, making it the oldest car care brand in the United States.

History
Founded in 1910 by George Simons, who developed a cleaner and a carnauba wax product for car finishes, along with Elmer Rich of the Great Northern Railway. The two organized the Simons Manufacturing Company. In 1912, Mr. Rich and his brother, R.J. Rich, acquired full ownership. They changed the name of the firm to Simoniz Company and located the first office and backroom factory at 2121 South Michigan Avenue in Chicago which was at the time was known as "Automobile Row". Elmer Rich used the prominence of radio to promote his product with the slogan "Motorists Wise, Simoniz".

An Institutional Division was officially organized in 1954. This division offered a line of floor waxes, finishes, polishes, cleaners and sponges that were formulated and packaged expressly for business and public large-volume users. It was during 1957 that Vista One-Step Cleaner/Wax entered the market.

In 1965, Morton International purchased the controlling interest in Simoniz Company, adding Master Wax-Detergent Proof and Smooth-Pre Softened products to the line. In 1976, Simoniz was acquired by Union Carbide. Union Carbide introduced numerous products into the marketplace, including Shines Like the Sun, Super Poly, Body Guard, Double Wax, Simoniz II, Shine Booster and Super Blue. In 1986, as a part of the divestiture of Union Carbide, a management-led LBO formed First Brands Corp. and Simoniz was among the brands purchased. In 1988, First Brands entered into a license agreement with Syndet Products, Inc. to manufacture and distribute on-line Simoniz brand products nationally to the car wash industry, which eventually expanded to include detail shop and janitorial/sanitation (JanSan) cleaning products. 

In 1997, Syndet Products purchased the Simoniz brand from First Brands Corp., and renamed the company Simoniz USA, Inc.

In popular culture

The term "Simoniz" or "Simonizing" has entered the public lexicon as a means to wax one's car.

In “A Christmas Story”, Ralphie’s father appears slightly disappointed when he receives a can of Simoniz on Christmas Morning.

References

External links
 

Automotive chemicals
Chemical companies established in 1910
Manufacturing companies based in Connecticut
1910 establishments in Illinois